Keith Burgess is an American voice actor. He voiced Akuma in Street Fighter Alpha: The Animation and Street Fighter Alpha: Generations. He also loaned his voice in the two anime movies Evangelion: Death and Rebirth, The End of Evangelion and Karas: The Prophecy. He was a staff member for Manga Entertainment Inc. He has played Street Fighter IV, when he appeared at FanimeCon 2009, challenging Reuben Langdon at the game.

Roles
 Karas: The Prophecy as Suiko
 Ikki Tousen as Gang Member
 Street Fighter Alpha: The Movie as Akuma
 Street Fighter Alpha: Generations as Akuma
 Dead Leaves as Chinko Drill
 Death & Rebirth as Makoto Hyuga
 The End of Evangelion as Makoto Hyuga

As staff member
 Death & Rebirth
 The End of Evangelion
 Noein
 Rayearth
 Read or Die (OVA)
 Tokko (manga)

References

External links

Year of birth missing (living people)
Living people
American male voice actors
Place of birth missing (living people)